Breyeriana cistransandina is a moth in the family Cossidae, and the only species in the genus Breyeriana. It is found in Argentina and Chile.

References

Natural History Museum Lepidoptera generic names catalog

Hypoptinae